Northern Virginia FC (formerly Northern Virginia Royals and Evergreen FC) is an American soccer club from Leesburg, Virginia competing in USL League Two, USL W League, Eastern Premier Soccer League and the Major Arena Soccer League 3.

The club's women's team was known as the Northern Virginia Majestics, who played in the women's USL W-League, and fielded a team in the USL’s Super-20 League, a league for players 17 to 20 years of age run under the United Soccer Leagues umbrella. Throughout their recent history, NVFC previously enjoyed minor league affiliation with D.C. United, the nearby Major League Soccer franchise.

History

Professional 
Northern Virginia FC was founded in 1998 and joined the USISL D-3 Pro League as an expansion franchise in 1998, entering the team under the name Northern Virginia Royals. They ended their first season in 7th place in the Atlantic Division with a 5-12-1 record. In their second season, they improved, winning 10 of their 18 regular season games, finishing fourth in the Atlantic Division and also qualified for their first US Open Cup campaign in 1999, where they were upset in the first round by Florida PDL side Cocoa Expos 5-3. In the playoffs they beat divisional rivals South Carolina Shamrocks 2-1 in the first round before falling 4-0 to Charlotte in the conference semi-final. The 1998 season and the Royals were featured in the book "Unlucky: A Season of Struggle in Minor League Professional Soccer" by Dave Ungrady, who trained and played briefly for the Royals as well

The D-3 Pro League became the USL Pro Select League in 2003, and the Royals finished bottom of the 3-team Southern Division, with just 6 wins for the year. 
The USL Pro Select League became the USL Second Division in 2005, and dispensed with divisions in favor of a single-table format; for the Royals, this proved to be yet another disastrous season.

Move to PDL 
After finishing bottom of the league in the USL Second Division, the Royals management took the decision to self-relegate themselves to the USL Premier Development League for the 2006 season. The Royals won their first match in the amateur PDL 3-1 over West Virginia Chaos, ultimately finishing fourth in the Mid Atlantic Division in their debut 2006 season.

The Northern Virginia Royals were inducted into the USL Soccer Hall of Fame in 2007.

Partnership with D.C. United
In 2015, the Royals rebranded as Evergreen FC and partnered with Major League Soccer club D.C. United and formed a joint PDL team called D.C. United U-23, who combined their NPSL side with the Royals, to play in the PDL, finishing fifth in the Mid-Atlantic Division.

Evergreen Hammers

After the 2015 season, the Royals transferred their operations and relocated to Loudon County, Virginia in 2016 playing under the Evergreen FC banner as the Evergreen Hammers.

Northern Virginia FC
For the 2021 season, Evergreen which was already part of the Northern Virginia FC club, renamed the USL League Two club to the Northern Virginia banner. NoVa FC had already operated teams under that name in the lower level United Premier Soccer League and Eastern Premier Soccer League.

On 27 August 2021, NoVa FC announced they would be reviving the women's program with a new side in the USL W League beginning in 2022.

Logo history

Year-by-year

Professional/USL League Two

Eastern Premier Soccer League

Major Arena Soccer League 3

Honors

League
Eastern Premiere Soccer League
Mid-Atlantic Conference Regular Season Champion (1): 2021-22
Playoff Champion (1): 2021-22

Major Arena Soccer League 3
East Division Regular Season Champion (1): 2022
Playoff Champion (1): 2022

Cups
Metropolitan DC-Virginia Soccer Association
MDCVSA State Cup (1): 2021
US Adult Soccer Association Region I
National Amateur Cup Region I (1): 2022
US Adult Soccer Association
National Amateur Cup (Runner-Up): 2022

Head coaches 
  Silvino Gonzalo (1998–2007)
  John Pascarella (2007–2008)
  Tom Torres (2009–2010)
  Richie Burke (2011–2012)
  Grady Renfrow (2013–2014)
  Richie Burke (2014–2015)
  Brian Welsh (2014–2015)
  Ian Bishop (2016)
  Grady Renfrow (2017)
  Paul Ngend (2018–2019)
  Grady Renfrow (2021–)

References

External links 
 Official website
 Official PDL site

Association football clubs established in 1998
USL League Two teams
Sports in Northern Virginia
Leesburg, Virginia
Soccer clubs in Virginia
D.C. United
USL Second Division teams
1998 establishments in Virginia